Lurleen Burns Wallace (born Lurleen Brigham Burns; September 19, 1926 – May 7, 1968) was the 46th governor of Alabama for 16 months from January 16, 1967 until her untimely death on May 7, 1968. She was the first wife of Alabama governor George Wallace, whom she succeeded as governor because the Alabama constitution forbade consecutive terms. She was Alabama's first female governor and was the only female governor to hold the position until Kay Ivey became the second woman to succeed to the office in 2017. She is also (as of 2023) the only female governor in U.S. history to have died in office as well as being the first and so far currently to date only female Democrat to have serve as Alabama state governor in Alabama's state history. In 1973, she was posthumously inducted into the Alabama Women's Hall of Fame.

Early years
Lurleen Brigham Burns was born to Henry Burns and the former Estelle Burroughs of Fosters in Tuscaloosa County. She graduated in 1942 from Tuscaloosa County High School at the age of fifteen. She then worked at Kresge's Five and Dime in Tuscaloosa, where she met George Wallace, at the time a member of the United States Army Air Corps. The couple married on May 22, 1943, when she was 16.

Over the next twenty years, Wallace focused on being a mother and a homemaker. The Wallaces had four children: Bobbi Jo Wallace Parsons (1944–2015), Peggy Sue Wallace Kennedy (born 1950), George III (born 1951), and Janie Lee Wallace Dye (born 1961). George Wallace's neglect of his family and frequent extramarital affairs resulted in his wife filing for divorce in the late 1950s; she later dropped the suit after he promised to be a better husband. By all accounts, the two had a very happy marriage for the rest of her life.

Wallace assumed her duties as First Lady of Alabama in 1963 after her husband was elected governor to the first of his four nonconsecutive terms. She opened the first floor of the governor's mansion to the public seven days a week. She refused to serve alcoholic beverages at official functions.

1966 gubernatorial election campaign
When George Wallace failed in 1965 to get the constitutional ban on his candidacy lifted, he devised a plan in which Lurleen would run for governor while he continued to exercise the authority of the office behind the scenes, duplicating the strategy in which Miriam Wallace Ferguson won the 1924 election for governor of Texas, as her husband James E. Ferguson remained the de facto governor.

Shy in public and lacking interest in the workings of politics, Lurleen Wallace was described by an Alabama newspaper editor as the most "unlikely candidate imaginable. It is as difficult to picture her in politics as to envision Helen Hayes butchering a hog." She herself said "it never even crossed my mind that I'd ever enter politics...."

Lurleen Wallace dispatched a primary gubernatorial field that included two former governors, John Malcolm Patterson and Jim Folsom, former congressman Carl Elliott of Jasper, and Attorney General Richmond Flowers, Sr. She then faced one-term Republican U.S. representative James D. Martin of Gadsden, who had received national attention four years earlier when he mounted a serious challenge to U.S. senator J. Lister Hill.

The general election campaign focused on whether Wallace would be governor in her own right or a "caretaker" with her husband as a "dollar-a-year-advisor" making all the major decisions. The decision to run against Wallace heavily damaged the Alabama GOP. Nearly overnight, its fortunes vanished, for most expected George Wallace to succeed in electing his wife, who was running not as the former "Lurleen Burns" but as "Mrs. George C. Wallace."  
 
Neither Martin nor Lurleen Wallace openly sought support from the increasing number of African American voters, many of whom had been registered only since the passage a year earlier of the Voting Rights Act, approved in the political environment of the Selma-to-Montgomery march. George Wallace kept the racial issue alive when he signed state legislation to nullify desegregation guidelines between Alabama cities and counties and the former United States Department of Health, Education, and Welfare. Wallace claimed that the law would thwart the national government from intervening in schools. Critics denounced Wallace's "political trickery" and expressed alarm at the potential forfeiture of federal funds.  Martin accused the Democrats of "playing politics with your children" and "neglecting academic excellence."
 
False reports of Republican strength in Alabama abounded. The New York Times predicted that Martin "not only has a chance to win the governorship, but at least for the moment must be rated as the favorite." Political writer Theodore H. White incorrectly predicted that Alabama, instead of Arkansas and Florida as it developed, would in 1966 become the first former Confederate state to elect a Republican governor. Briefly, a consensus developed that Martin might even lend coattails to Republican candidates in legislative, county, and municipal elections though there was no GOP nominee for lieutenant governor. The defections of three legislators and a member of the Democratic State Executive Committee reinforced such possibilities. The New York Times said Alabama Democrats had denounced the national party for so long that it became "no longer popular in many quarters to be a Democrat." Martin said the South must "break away from the one-party system just as we broke away from a one-crop economy." He vowed to make Alabama "first in opportunity, jobs, and education."

Keener insight at the time would have revealed that Martin was pursuing the one office essentially off limits to the GOP that year. No Republican had served as governor of Alabama since David Peter Lewis vacated the office in 1874, and George Wallace's organization proved insurmountable despite an early poll that placed Martin within range of victory.

Jim Martin proclaimed that Wallace was a "proxy" candidate, a manifestation of her husband's "insatiable appetite for power."  Lurleen Wallace used the slogan "Two Governors, One Cause" and proclaimed the words Alabama and freedom to be synonyms. Martin bemoaned having to campaign against a woman, a position that would soon become anachronistic. Though he was running for state office, Martin focused much attention on U.S. President Lyndon B. Johnson, unpopular with many in Alabama because of the Vietnam War, inflation, and urban unrest. "We want to see this war ended, and it's going to take a change of administration to do it", Martin said.

At the state level, Martin questioned a $500,000 school book depository contract awarded to Wallace supporter Elton B. Stephens of Ebsco Investment Company. Martin challenged "secret deals" regarding the construction of highways or schools" and "conspiracies between the state house and the White House." 
 
At her general election campaign kickoff in Birmingham, Wallace pledged "progress without compromise" and "accomplishment without surrender ... George will continue to speak up and stand up for Alabama."  She continued: "Contrary to what the liberals preach, progress can be made without sacrificing the free enterprise system and ... the Constitution." It was during this 1966 campaign that George Wallace coined his famous line: "There's not a dime's worth of difference" between the two national parties." Wallace likened such Republicans as the then House Minority Leader Gerald Ford, and Chief Justice Earl Warren, who supported civil rights legislation, to "vultures" who presided over the destruction of the U.S. Constitution.

U.S. senator Strom Thurmond and former U.S. senator Barry Goldwater, the 1964 Republican presidential nominee, campaigned on behalf of Martin and GOP Senate nominee John Grenier of Birmingham. Thurmond, who had carried Alabama in 1948 as the nominee of the Dixiecrats, addressed an all-white GOP state convention, where he denounced the national Democratic leadership as "the most dangerous people in the country" and urged a "return to constitutional government." George Wallace was so irritated over Goldwater's appearance on Martin's behalf that he questioned why Goldwater could win only six states in the 1964 race against President Johnson. "Where were the Republicans when I was fighting LBJ?" Wallace asked. Goldwater shunned personal criticism of Wallace but repudiated Wallace's talk of a third party in the 1968 presidential election.

Lurleen Wallace carried all Alabama counties except for two: Greene in west Alabama, which she lost by six votes, and predominantly Republican Winston in north Alabama. She drew 537,505 votes (63.4 percent). Martin trailed with 262,943 votes (31 percent). A third candidate running to the political left of the major candidates, Dr. Carl Robinson, received 47,655 (5.6 percent). Martin even ran eight percentage points behind his ticket mate, John Grenier, who was defeated for the Senate by incumbent Democrat John Sparkman.

Governorship, illness, and death
The 1966 results showed that George Wallace, strengthened at the time by his opposition to desegregation, could have easily won a second term had he been constitutionally eligible to do so. In Alabama, as in most southern U.S. states at the time, governors were not allowed to serve two consecutive terms (a law still maintained exclusively, as of 2023, to date, only in Virginia). This provision was incorporated in 1901 in the current Alabama state constitution.

George Wallace eventually succeeded in getting the term limit repealed, and he would serve three more terms, two of them consecutively. In those days, the Democratic nomination was tantamount to election in Alabama, and despite the Jim Martin challenge, Lurleen Wallace was inaugurated in January 1967. To assuage voters who might have been concerned about the transfer of power, she stated that her husband would be her "Numer 1 assistant".

Wallace made her gubernatorial race having been secretly diagnosed with cancer as early as April 1961, when her surgeon biopsied suspicious tissue that he noticed during the cesarean delivery of her last child. As was common at the time, her physician told her husband the news, not her. George Wallace insisted that she not be informed. As a result, she did not get appropriate follow-up care. When she saw a gynecologist for abnormal bleeding in 1965, his diagnosis of uterine cancer came as a complete shock to her. When one of her husband's staffers revealed to her that Wallace had discussed her cancer with them, but not her, during his 1962 campaign three years earlier, she was outraged.

In order to facilitate his plan to use her as a surrogate candidate in 1966, Lurleen Wallace cooperated with a campaign of dissimulation and misdirection as she began radiation therapy in December 1965. This was followed by a hysterectomy in January 1966. Despite her ill health, Wallace maintained an arduous campaign schedule throughout 1966 and gave a 24-minute speech her longest ever at her January 1967 inauguration.

Early in her term, Wallace's condition began to deteriorate. In June 1967, an abdominal growth was found. During surgery on July 10, this proved to be an egg-sized malignancy on her colon. She underwent a second course of radiation therapy as a follow-up. In January 1968, after extensive testing, she informed her staff (but not the public) that she had a cancerous pelvic tumor which was pressing on the nerves of her back down through her right hip. Even with the prior surgeries on her uterus and colon and despite the radiation treatment, the cancer had spread.

Her last public appearance as governor was at the 1967 Blue–Gray Football Classic, followed by a campaign appearance for her husband's presidential bid on the American Party ticket on January 11, 1968. Her illness was obvious and worsening. The pelvic tumor was removed in late February. This was followed by surgery to treat an abdominal abscess, and in late March 1968, more surgery to dissolve a blood clot in her left lung. By April, the cancer was in her liver and lungs, and she weighed less than eighty pounds.

Her husband, George Wallace, persistently lied to the press about her condition, claiming in April 1968 that "she has won the fight" against cancer. He continued to make campaign stops nationwide during her last weeks of life, but her doctors warned him she was in unstable condition on May 5, the day he was to leave for a Michigan appearance. At her request, he cancelled a television appearance on May 6, when she was too ill to be moved back to the hospital. Wallace died in Montgomery, Alabama, at 12:34 A.M. May 7, 1968, at home with her husband beside her and the rest of her family, including her parents, just outside her room, and the couple's three youngest children in the next room near it. She was only age 41 years old.
 
Wallace lay in state in the Capitol building on May 8, and 21,000 mourners waited as long as five hours to view her silver casket. Despite her emphatic request for a closed casket, her widower insisted that her body be on view, with a glass bubble over the open part of the coffin. The day of her funeral, May 9, all public and private schools closed except for the Anniston Academy, all state offices closed, and most businesses closed or had abbreviated hours. She was interred at Greenwood Cemetery in Montgomery.

At the time of her funeral, George Wallace had moved out of the governor's mansion and back to a home that they had purchased in Montgomery in 1967. He did not take his children, ages 18, 16, and 6, with him. They were sent to live with family members and friends. Their eldest daughter had married and left home. George Wallace had two subsequent marriages to the former Cornelia Ellis Snively and Lisa Taylor, both of which ended in divorce.

Wallace's most notable independent action as governor was her attempt to get her husband to increase appropriations for the Bryce Hospital and the Partlow State School, a residential institution for the developmentally disabled. She had visited both institutions in Tuscaloosa on her own initiative in February 1967 after reading a news story about overcrowding and poor staffing. She was horrified by what she saw in the filthy, barracks-like settings.

Wallace was succeeded by Lieutenant Governor Albert Brewer, a one-time ally of her husband who soon showed a strong interest to govern in his own right and to retain the office in the 1970 election. Brewer was supported by President Richard Nixon, who wanted to neutralize Wallace as a presidential adversary for a second time. Wallace beat Brewer in the Democratic primary and returned as governor in January 1971, remaining in office for two consecutive terms. George Wallace also secured and served a fourth and final term from 1983 to 1987.

Legacies

In addition to her support for the modernization of Partlow State Hospital for children, Wallace obtained a large funding increase for Alabama state parks.  Lake Lurleen in Tuscaloosa County, Alabama is named in her memory.

Since Alabama then lacked adequate cancer treatment facilities, Wallace had to travel to the M. D. Anderson Cancer Center in Houston for diagnosis and treatment.  This underscored the need for improved cancer care in Alabama.  Following her death, the Lurleen Wallace Courage Crusade was spearheaded by her successor, Governor Albert Brewer, leading to fundraising for building a new cancer center.  The University of Alabama Hospital at the University of Alabama at Birmingham was selected as the site for the cancer center, and a formal cancer center program was begun in 1970. Funding was received from the National Cancer Institute, and the center became one of the first eight NCI-designated Comprehensive Cancer Centers. Dr. John Durant served as its first director.  Construction of the Lurleen B. Wallace Tumor Institute at UAB was begun in 1974 and was completed in 1976. The Wallace Patient Tower, an addition to University Hospital, was built in her honor, as was Lurleen B. Wallace Community College in Andalusia, Alabama; and Lurleen B. Wallace Hall on the campus of the University of West Alabama.

See also

List of female governors in the United States

References

External links
ADAH page
Pictures of her life
Alabama Women's Hall of Fame
Lurleen B. Wallace Community College page

Wallace Tumor Institute

|-

|-

1926 births
1968 deaths
20th-century American politicians
Wallace family of Alabama
Methodists from Alabama
Burials in Alabama
Deaths from cancer in Alabama
Deaths from uterine cancer
Democratic Party governors of Alabama
First Ladies and Gentlemen of Alabama
George Wallace
Politicians from Montgomery, Alabama
Politicians from Tuscaloosa, Alabama
Women state constitutional officers of Alabama
Women state governors of the United States
20th-century American women politicians